Savvas Pantelidis (born 7 April 1965) is a Greek professional football manager and former player.

Playing career 

Pantelidis played for club Doxa Vyronas from 1988 until 1997 before playing for Proodeftiki from 1997 until 2002.

Managerial career 

Pantelidis began his career as a coach for Thrasyvoulos from 2005 until 2007. He then coached Rodos, Fostiras, Kallithea, Egaleo, Trikala, Ethnikos Piraeus.

References

1965 births
Greek football managers
Footballers from Athens
Greek footballers
Trikala F.C. managers
Living people
Egaleo F.C. managers
Olympiacos Volos F.C. managers
PAS Giannina F.C. managers
Atromitos F.C. managers
Association football defenders
Doxa Vyronas F.C. players